Odilon Redon (born Bertrand Redon; ; 20 April 18406 July 1916) was a French Symbolist artist.

Early in his career, both before and after fighting in the Franco-Prussian War, Redon worked almost exclusively in charcoal and lithography, works known as his noirs. He gained recognition after his drawings were mentioned in the 1884 novel À rebours (Against Nature) by Joris-Karl Huysmans. During the 1890s, Redon began working in pastel and oil, which quickly became his favorite medium, abandoning his previous style of noirs completely after 1900. He developed a keen interest in Hindu and Buddhist religion and culture, which increasingly showed in his work.

Redon is perhaps best known today for the dreamlike paintings created in the first decade of the 20th century, which were inspired by Japanese art and leaned toward abstraction. His work is considered a precursor to Surrealism.

Early life
Odilon Redon was born in Bordeaux, Aquitaine, to a prosperous family. Redon's father made his fortune in the slave trade in Louisiana in the 1830s. Redon was conceived in New Orleans and the couple made the transatlantic journey back to France while his mother Marie Guérin, a French Creole woman, was pregnant with his brother Gaston. The young Bertrand Redon acquired the nickname "Odilon" from his mother's first name, Odile. Redon started drawing as a child; at the age of ten, he was awarded a drawing prize at school. He began the formal study of drawing at fifteen but, at his father's insistence, he changed to architecture. Failure to pass the entrance exams at Paris' École des Beaux-Arts ended any plans for a career as an architect, although he briefly studied painting there under Jean-Léon Gérôme in 1864. (His younger brother Gaston Redon would become a noted architect.)

Back in his native Bordeaux, he took up sculpting, and Rodolphe Bresdin instructed him in etching and lithography. His artistic career was interrupted in 1870 when he was drafted to serve in the army in the Franco-Prussian War until its end in 1871.

Career
At the end of the war, Redon moved to Paris and resumed working almost exclusively in charcoal and lithography. He called his visionary works, conceived in shades of black, his noirs. It was not until 1878 that his work gained any recognition with Guardian Spirit of the Waters; he published his first album of lithographs, titled Dans le Rêve, in 1879. Still, Redon remained relatively unknown until the appearance in 1884 of a cult novel by Joris-Karl Huysmans titled À rebours (Against Nature). The story featured a decadent aristocrat who collected Redon's drawings.

In 1886, Redon exhibited his work with the Impressionists in their the last exhibition. The same year, he also began participating in the exhibitions of Les XX in Brussels.

In the 1890s, Redon worked in pastel and oil; he did not make noirs after 1900. In 1899, he exhibited with the Nabis at Durand-Ruel's.

Redon had a keen interest in Hindu and Buddhist religion and culture. The figure of the Buddha increasingly showed in his work. Influences of Japonisme blended into his art, such as the painting The Death of the Buddha around 1899, The Buddha in 1906, Jacob and the Angel in 1905, and Vase with Japanese Warrior in 1905, among others.

Baron Robert de Domecy (1867–1946) commissioned Redon in 1899 to create 17 decorative panels for the dining room of the Château de Domecy-sur-le-Vault near Sermizelles in Burgundy. Redon had created large decorative works for private residences in the past, but his compositions for the château de Domecy in 1900–1901 were his most radical compositions to that point and mark the transition from ornamental to abstract painting. The landscape details do not show a specific place or space. Only details of trees, twigs with leaves, and budding flowers in an endless horizon can be seen. The colors used are mostly yellow, grey, brown and light blue. The influence of the Japanese painting style found on folding screens, byōbu, is discernible in his choice of colors and the rectangular proportions of most of the up to 2.5 metres high panels. Fifteen of them are located today in the Musée d'Orsay, acquired in 1988.

Domecy also commissioned Redon to paint portraits of his wife and their daughter Jeanne, two of which are in the collections of the Musée d'Orsay and the Getty Museum in California. Most of the paintings remained in the Domecy family collection until the 1960s.

Awards
In 1903, Redon was awarded the Legion of Honour.

His popularity increased when a catalogue of etchings and lithographs was published by André Mellerio in 1913; that same year, he was given the largest single representation at the groundbreaking US International Exhibition of Modern Art (aka Armory Show), in New York City, Chicago and Boston.

Personal life
At 40, Redon married Camille Falte, a young Creole from Île Bourbon. They had a son, Arï Redon (30 April 1889 – 13 May 1972 in Paris). A visual artist himself, and subject of his father's portraiture as a child, Arï's partner was Suzanne Redon.

Death
Redon died on 6 July 1916 in Paris.

Legacy 
His choice of color and subject matter in the second part of his career led to Redon being considered a precursor to Dadaism and Surrealism. According to Surrealist André Masson, Redon's use of bright colors in his flower pastels, as well as his choice of depicting uncommon or imaginary species renders his works "released from stylized naturalism", thus demonstrating the "endless possibilities of lyrical chromatics".

In 1923, Mellerio published Odilon Redon: Peintre Dessinateur et Graveur. An archive of Mellerio's papers is held by the Ryerson & Burnham Libraries at the Art Institute of Chicago.

Modern exhibitions 
In 2005, the Museum of Modern Art launched an exhibition entitled "Beyond The Visible", a comprehensive overview of Redon's work showcasing more than 100 paintings, drawings, prints and books from The Ian Woodner Family Collection. The exhibition ran from 30 October 2005 to 23 January 2006.

In 2007, the Schirn Kunsthalle Frankfurt presented the exhibition "As in a Dream" with a survey of Redon's work with more than 200 drawings, lithographs, pastels, and paintings.

The Grand Palais in Paris, France featured a vast exhibition of Redon's art from March to June 2011 

The Fondation Beyeler in Basel, Switzerland showed a retrospective from February to May 2014.

The Kröller-Müller Museum in Otterlo, The Netherlands, had an exhibition with an emphasis on the role that literature and music played in Redon's life and work, under the title La littérature et la musique. The exhibition ran from 2 June to 9 September 2018.

Reception and interpretations of his work

During his early years as an artist, Redon's works were described as "a synthesis of nightmares and dreams", as they contained dark, fantastical figures from the artist's own imagination. His work represents an exploration of his internal feelings and psyche. Redon  wanted to place "the logic of the visible at the service of the invisible". A telling source of Redon's inspiration and the forces behind his works can be found in his journal A Soi-même (To Myself). Of his process he wrote:

Redon's drawings are characterized as mysterious and evocative by Joris-Karl Huysmans in the following passage from the novel À rebours (1884):

The art historian Michael Gibson says that Redon began to want his works, even the ones darker in colour and subject matter, to portray "the triumph of light over darkness."

Redon described his work as ambiguous and undefinable:

Redon was the inspiration for Guy Maddin's 1995 short film Odilon Redon, or The Eye Like a Strange Balloon Mounts Toward Infinity.

Gallery

References

Bibliography
 Russell T. Clement, Four French Symbolists: A Sourcebook on Pierre Puvis de Chavannes, Gustave Moreau, Odilon Redon, and Maurice Denis, Greenwood Press, 1996,  & 
Jodi Hauptman and Marina Van Zuylen, Beyond the Visible: The Art of Odilon Redon, 2005,  & 
Andre Mellerio, Odilon Redon, 1968, ASIN B0007DNIKO
Odilon Redon and Alfred Werner, The Graphic Works of Odilon Redon, Dover, 1969, 
Odilon Redon and Alfred Werner, The Graphic Works of Odilon Redon, (Dover Pictorial Archive), 2005,  & 
Margret Stuffmann, Odilon Redon: As in a Dream, 2007,  &

External links

 
 odilonredon.net – Online biography and pictures of Odilon Redon
 Artcyclopedia – Links to Redon's works
 The Athenaeum – Extensive list and images of Redon's works
 Museum Syndicate – Odilon Redon Gallery at Museum Syndicate
 Web Museum – Biography and images of Redon's works
 
 MoMA Exhibition – "Beyond the Visible – The Art of Odilon Redon" – MoMA exhibition (October 2005 – January 2006)
 www.odilon-redon.org – Site with 322 images by Odilon Redon
 odilon.chez.com – Timeline of Redon's life
 Redon's Cats

1840 births
1916 deaths
Artists from Bordeaux
19th-century French painters
French male painters
20th-century French painters
20th-century French male artists
19th-century French engravers
20th-century French engravers
19th-century French lithographers
20th-century French lithographers
Post-impressionist painters
French Symbolist painters
French military personnel of the Franco-Prussian War
Recipients of the Legion of Honour
French draughtsmen
20th-century French printmakers
19th-century French male artists